The year 2000 is the eighth year in the history of Pancrase, a mixed martial arts promotion based in Japan. In 2000 Pancrase held 13 events beginning with Pancrase: Trans 1.

Title fights

Events list

Pancrase: Trans 1

Pancrase: Trans 1 was an event held on January 23, 2000 at Korakuen Hall in Tokyo, Japan.

Results

Pancrase: Trans 2

Pancrase: Trans 2 was an event held on February 27, 2000 at Umeda Stella Hall in Osaka, Osaka, Japan.

Results

Pancrase: Trans 3

Pancrase: Trans 3 was an event held on April 30, 2000 at the Yokohama Cultural Gymnasium in Yokohama, Kanagawa, Japan.

Results

Pancrase: Trans 4

Pancrase: Trans 4 was an event held on June 26, 2000 at Korakuen Hall, Tokyo, Japan.

Results

Pancrase: Australia

Pancrase: Australia was an event held on July 10, 2000 in Australia.

Results

Pancrase: 2000 Neo-Blood Tournament Opening Round

Pancrase: 2000 Neo-Blood Tournament Opening Round was an event held on July 23, 2000 at Korakuen Hall in Tokyo, Japan.

Results

Pancrase: Trans 5

Pancrase: Trans 5 was an event held on July 23, 2000 at Korakuen Hall in Tokyo, Japan.

Results

Pancrase: 2000 Neo-Blood Tournament Second Round

Pancrase: 2000 Neo-Blood Tournament Second Round was an event held on August 27, 2000 at Umeda Stella Hall in Osaka, Osaka, Japan.

Results

Pancrase: 2000 Anniversary Show

Pancrase: 2000 Anniversary Show was an event held on September 24, 2000 at the Yokohama Cultural Gymnasium in Yokohama, Kanagawa, Japan.

Results

Pancrase: Trans 6

Pancrase: Trans 6 was an event held on October 31, 2000 at Korakuen Hall in Tokyo, Japan.

Results

Pancrase: Pancrase UK

Pancrase: Pancrase UK was an event held on November 25, 2000 at York Hall in London, England.

Results

Pancrase: Trans 7

Pancrase: Trans 7 was an event held on December 4, 2000 at the Japanese Martial Arts Building in Tokyo, Japan.

Results

Pancrase: Trans 8

Pancrase: Trans 8 was an event held on December 9, 2000 at the Aomori Prefectural Gymnasium in Aomori, Japan.

Results

See also 
 Pancrase
 List of Pancrase champions
 List of Pancrase events

References

Pancrase events
2000 in mixed martial arts